"Hello" is a song recorded by English singer-songwriter Adele, released on 23 October 2015 by XL Recordings as the lead single from her third studio album, 25 (2015). Written by Adele and with its producer, Greg Kurstin, "Hello" is a piano ballad with soul influences (including guitar and drums), and lyrics that discuss themes of nostalgia and regret. Upon release, the song garnered critical acclaim, with reviewers comparing it favourably to Adele's previous works and praised its lyrics, production and Adele's vocal performance. It was recorded in  Metropolis Studios, London.

"Hello" was a massive global success, topping the records charts in a record-setting 36 countries, including in the United Kingdom where it became Adele's second chart topper, following "Someone Like You", and had the largest opening week sales in three years. In the United States, "Hello" debuted atop the Billboard Hot 100, reigning for ten consecutive weeks whilst becoming Adele's fourth number-one single on the chart and breaking several records, including becoming the first song to sell over a million digital copies in a week. By the end of 2015, it had sold 12.3 million units globally (combined sales and track-equivalent streams) and was the year's 7th best-selling single while it stands as one of the best-selling digital singles of all-time.

The accompanying music video was directed by Xavier Dolan and co-stars Adele and Tristan Wilds. "Hello" broke the iTunes records for being number 1 in most countries (102 countries) and the first song to be number 1 in over 100 countries. The music video for the song broke the Vevo record by achieving over 27.7 million views within a 24-hour span, held previously by Taylor Swift's "Bad Blood" and the YouTube record for the shortest time to reach one billion views (87 days). The music video for the song received seven nominations at the 2016 MTV Video Music Awards, including Video of the Year and Best Female Video. At the 59th Annual Grammy Awards, "Hello" won three awards: Record of the Year, Song of the Year, and Best Pop Solo Performance. The song also won the Brit Award for British Single, and APRA Award for International Work of the Year.

Writing and composition

"Hello" was written by Adele and Greg Kurstin and produced by Kurstin, who also played bass, guitar, drums, piano and keyboards, while Adele played drums. "Hello" was written in Chiswick, London, something not normally done by Adele, who said she likes to write her music at home. The writing process for the song was slow, taking six months to complete. Initially Adele and Kurstin started writing the first verse; finishing half of the song, six months later Adele contacted Kurstin to finish the song with her, with Kurstin stating he was not sure "if Adele was ever going to come back and finish it."

"Hello" is a soul piano ballad, played in the key of F minor at a tempo of 79 beats per minute. The repeated chord progression heard in the verse, played by the piano, follows two progressions and a passage (Bridge) progression (passage or Bridge progression connects two main progressions to each other) of Progression #1: Fm(i)–A(III)–E(VII)–D(VI), Passage progression: Fm(i)–E(VII)-Cm(v)-D(VI)-Fm7(i7)-E(VII)–D(VI), Progression #2:Fm(i)–D/F(VI)–A(III)–E(VII). According to Musicnotes.com, Adele's vocals span from F3 to A5 in the song. During the chorus, Adele is heard singing the lines over layers of backing vocals, piano and drums which were described by The Daily Telegraph as having "a very luscious wall of sound".

Lyrically, the song focuses on themes of nostalgia and regret, and was seen as a follow-up to her single "Someone like You" appearing to reflect on a failed relationship. The song's lyrics were also seen as being conversational, revolving around "all the relationships of her past", ranging from friends, family members and ex-partners. Speaking on the song's lyrical content, Adele told Nick Grimshaw on The Radio 1 Breakfast Show: "I felt all of us were moving on, and it's not about an ex-relationship, a love relationship, it's about my relationship with everyone that I love. It's not that we have fallen out, we've all got our lives going on and I needed to write that song so they would all hear it, because I'm not in touch with them." According to Adele, the line "Hello from the other side" signifies "the other side of becoming an adult, making it out alive from your late teens, early twenties."

Release
On 18 October 2015, a 30-second clip of "Hello" was played during a commercial break on The X Factor in the United Kingdom. The commercial teased what was then new material, with her vocals accompanied by lyrics on a black screen. Josh Duboff of Vanity Fair wrote that "the Internet collectively lost their minds" after the broadcast of the trailer.
On 22 October, Adele announced the upcoming release of 25 to her fans on Twitter. She also shared that "Hello" would be released on 23 October as the lead single off of the album.
On 23 October, Adele joined Nick Grimshaw's show on BBC Radio 1 for the song's premiere.

Critical reception
"Hello" received universal critical acclaim. Alexis Petridis of The Guardian described it as "a big ballad, but a superior example of its kind", and opined that the song is "precisely the kind of lovelorn epic ballad that made Adele one of the biggest stars in the world." Writing for  The Independent, Emily Jupp stated in her review of the song that it "might not be groundbreaking, but Adele's return with her familiar, smoky sound is very welcome". She called it an if it ain't broke' ballad" and said: "Adele does what she does best, belting out emotional tales of love and loss much the same as with her last album, 21, but this time, with a little more self-forgiveness."

Greg Kot of the Chicago Tribune wrote: "Lyrics that work best when they zoom in on personal details match her combination of vocal power and restraint."
Neil McCormick from The Daily Telegraph called it "a beautiful song of loss and regret", adding that "it takes a grip on the kind of memory every listener holds somewhere in their heart and merges it with Adele's own drama." Rolling Stone ranked "Hello" at number 6 on its year-end list to find the 50 best songs of 2015. Several publications have commented on similarities in the theme of the song and accompanying video with that of "Hello" by American singer Lionel Richie.

In 2021, Parade ranked the song number 12 on their list of the 25 greatest Adele songs, and in 2022, American Songwriter ranked the song number three on their list of the 10 greatest Adele songs.

Chart performance

Europe and Oceania
Three days after its release, the Official Charts Company announced that "Hello" had accumulated 165,000 chart sales in the United Kingdom, of which 156,000 were downloads. "Hello" entered at the top of the UK Singles Chart on 30 October 2015, for the week dated 5 November 2015 with 333,000 combined sales, of which 259,000 were downloads, making it the biggest selling number-one single on the chart in three years. It marked Adele's second UK number-one single, after 2011's "Someone like You". Additionally, "Hello" was streamed 7.32 million times in its first week, breaking the streaming record previously held by Justin Bieber's "What Do You Mean?". Including streaming sales and excluding The X Factor and Pop Idol winners' singles, major charity campaign records and Christmas number ones, "Hello" was the second biggest selling number one of the 21st century in the UK, beaten only by Shaggy's "It Wasn't Me", which sold 345,000 copies in a week in February 2001. The following week, the song remained at number one after selling a further 121,000 downloads and was streamed 5.78 million times, the same week the song was certified Gold by the BPI. On 20 May 2016, it spent its 30th week in the UK Top 100. As of November 2016, the song has sold 918,700 in pure sales.

The song also debuted at number one in Belgium, Czech Republic, France, Germany, Greece, Hungary, Ireland, Israel, Italy, Lebanon, Luxembourg, The Netherlands, Norway, Portugal, Scotland, Slovakia, Spain and Switzerland.

In Australia, "Hello" entered at the top of the ARIA Singles Chart on 31 October 2015, selling over 59,075 units, which earned the song a gold certification in its first week. The song also became the second fastest-selling single of the year, behind Wiz Khalifa's "See You Again". It marked Adele's second number-one single on the ARIA Singles Chart following 2011's "Someone like You". The single stayed atop the chart for a second week and was certified platinum selling over 70,000 units. On 20 March 2017, Hello re-entered the chart at number 50 and has so far been certified 7× platinum for sales over 490,000 units.

In New Zealand, the song debuted at number one on the New Zealand singles chart, holding the position the following week and was certified platinum.

North America
In the United States, "Hello" debuted at the top of the Billboard Hot 100 on 2 November 2015, for the chart dated 14 November 2015, becoming only the 24th song to debut at number one. "Hello" started at number 49 on the Radio Songs chart, after three days of release. In its first full week of airplay, it rose from 45 to 9, up 146% to 70 million all format audience impressions. The track started at number one on the On-Demand Songs chart with a record 20.4 million on-demand streams, becoming her first number-one song on the chart. "Hello" entered at the top of the Digital Songs chart with sales of 1,112,000, becoming the first track to sell over one million digital copies in a single week and almost doubling the record for the most downloads sold in a week, previously held by Flo Rida's "Right Round", which sold 636,000 downloads in the week ending 28 February 2009. "Hello" started with 61.6 million US streams, becoming her first number-one song and the second greatest weekly total on the Streaming Songs chart, behind Baauer's "Harlem Shake", which registered 103 million streams on week of 3 March 2013. "Hello" is the first song to sell more than a million digital copies in a single week and the third highest weekly sales total since Nielsen SoundScan began tracking sales in 1991. Only Elton John's "Candle in the Wind 1997/Something About the Way You Look Tonight" has sold more in a single week, selling 3.446 million copies in its opening week and 1.212 million copies in its second week.

In its second week, "Hello" stayed at number one on the US Billboard Hot 100, selling another 635,000 digital copies marking the third-best digital sales week and the highest for a non-debut week. "Hello" also held atop Streaming Songs with 47.4 million US streams, down 23 percent from 61.6 million in its first week, the track also stayed atop the On-Demand Songs with 18.1 million streams. On the Radio Songs chart, "Hello" moved from 9 to 6, up by 46% to 106 million all-format audience impressions, thus becoming the top Airplay Gainer on the Hot 100. The track also moved from two to one on the Adult Alternative Songs airplay chart and moved nine to four on the Adult Contemporary format. The following week, the song stayed at the top of the Hot 100 and Digital Songs chart, selling 480,000 downloads and becoming just the third song to sell over 400,000 copies for three straight weeks. "Hello" also rose from 6 to 1 on the Radio Songs chart in just its fourth week  (the greatest leap to number one on the chart's 25-year history), marking the quickest climb to number one on the chart in 22 years, since Mariah Carey's "Dreamlover" reached the top in its fourth frame on 28 August 1993. Additionally, "Hello" became just the third song to top the Hot 100, Digital Songs, Streaming Songs, On-Demand Songs and Radio Songs tallies simultaneously in the nearly three years all five charts had coexisted. "Hello" remained atop the Hot 100 for ten consecutive weeks, becoming only the 31st No. 1 in the Hot 100's history to reign for at least 10 weeks, and only the 4th for a number one debut, following "One Sweet Day" by Mariah Carey and Boyz II Men (16 weeks), "Candle in the Wind 1997/Something About the Way You Look Tonight" by Elton John (14 weeks) and I'll Be Missing You by Puff Daddy & Faith Evans featuring 112 (11 weeks). By spending a tenth week at the top of the chart, it became Adele's longest-running number-one single and the longest-leading Hot 100 No. 1 by a solo female since Rihanna's "We Found Love," featuring Calvin Harris, which also led for 10 weeks in 2011–2012. As of January 2016, it had sold 3.7 million downloads. The single also benefitted from numerous Dance/EDM remixes as well, thus resulting in "Hello" topping Billboard's Dance Club Songs and Dance/Mix Show Airplay charts. On the chart dated 23 April 2016, the song spent a 21st week at the top of the Adult Contemporary Chart, matching the record set by Kelly Clarkson's "Breakaway" (2005) and Celine Dion's "A New Day Has Come" (2002) for the longest No. 1 run among women since the list launched in 1961. It also equaled the third-longest stay at the summit among all acts. On 20 September 2016, the song was certified as seven-times platinum by Recording Industry Association of America.

"Hello" debuted at number one on the Canadian Hot 100 on 3 November 2015, for the chart dated 14 November 2015, selling 140,000 copies and outsold Justin Bieber's "Sorry", which sold 40,000 units the same week. The song was streamed 4.79 million times in its first week, setting a record for the most streamed track in a single week in Canada.

Accolades

At the 36th Brit Awards, Adele was nominated for five awards, in which she won four including British Single of the Year for "Hello". At the 2016 Billboard Music Awards, the singer was nominated for nine categories, winning five, including Top Selling Song for "Hello". At the 2016 Juno Awards, Xavier Dolan won Video of the Year for "Hello". Adele received four American Music Awards nominations, including Favorite Pop/Rock Song for "Hello" at the American Music Awards of 2016 but lost to "Love Yourself" by Justin Bieber. At the 59th Grammy Awards Adele take five awards, including Album of the Year for 25, while "Hello" won Record of the Year, Song of the Year and Best Pop Solo Performance. Adele is the first artist in Grammys history to sweep the Big Three awards — Album, Record and Song of the Year — twice. She also the first woman in Grammy history to win Song of the Year twice. This marks the first time in Grammy history that two different songs with the same title have been nominated in this category after "Hello" by Lionel Richie in 1985. Adele became the third woman to win Record of the Year more than once, after Roberta Flack and Norah Jones winning for The First Time Ever I Saw Your Face and Killing Me Softly with His Song; and Don't Know Why and Here We Go Again (with Ray Charles), respectively. Additionally, both Florence LaRue and Marilyn McCoo also receive this accolade twice as part of The 5th Dimension, with "Up, Up and Away" and "Aquarius/Let the Sunshine In".

Music video

The accompanying music video for "Hello" was directed by Canadian actor and filmmaker Xavier Dolan and released on 22 October 2015, despite the fact the song was released as a single a day later. The concept of the video revolves around a recently broken-up young woman calling a younger version of herself. Portions of the video—mostly the finale on the pond and the shot of her opening her eyes in the beginning—were filmed with IMAX cameras, making it the first music video in IMAX format. The video draws inspiration from Dolan's semi-autobiographical debut I Killed My Mother, which was made when Dolan was barely 20. The video was filmed on a farm in Quebec over four days in September 2015.

The video stars American actor Tristan Wilds. According to Dolan, Adele called him after an unspecified incident of police brutality in the United States, suggesting that a white male not be cast as her love interest in the video. Dolan elaborated "She was just like, 'I'm concerned with the reality of the tensions between authorities and the black community, and I want to send a message out there.'" Dolan contacted Wilds via Skype and explained the concept for the video, which Wilds agreed to take part in. During the filming, both Adele and Wilds were asked to improvise and "tap into" their past relationships in order to convey the correct emotions. Dolan also filmed shots of both Adele and Wilds having conversations and laughing. The sepia toned video shows Adele performing the song in a small house and outside in a wooded forest, intercut with scenes of her making a tearful phone call and flashbacks to a past relationship with Wilds' character.

The flip phone used by Adele in the video was widely commented upon due to being of a retro style. Dolan replied to the remarks by saying: "It makes me uncomfortable filming iPhones because I feel like I'm shooting a commercial. Those things: iPhones, laptops, all those elements, to me, they bring me back to reality: That's not what you want. You want to get out of your own life; you want to enter someone else's; you want to travel somewhere; you want to be told a story. I'm realizing maybe I've been more distracting than anything else with that flip phone, but it wasn't intentional!"

The music video for "Hello" broke the previous Vevo Record by achieving over 27.7 million views within its first 24 hours of release. This record was previously held by the music video for Taylor Swift's "Bad Blood", which had amassed 20.1 million views in its first 24 hours. Later, the video continued to break Miley Cyrus' "Wrecking Ball" Vevo record for the fastest video to reach 100 million views in five days. The phrase "Adele hello" was also the top YouTube search term of Friday and Saturday, and on average the video was getting one million views per hour during the first two days, peaking at 1.6 million in a single hour, beating the peak view rate of the trailer for Star Wars: The Force Awakens, which peaked at 1.2 million views per hour. The video was parodied in a Thanksgiving-themed sketch on Saturday Night Live.

The video peaked as the 30th most viewed video on YouTube in 2020, having earned over 2.8 billion views, as well as the 26th most liked video on the platform in 2015, with over 17 million likes. The video holds the Guinness world record for the "fastest time for a video to reach 1 billion views" in 87 days.

Live performances
Adele performed "Hello" live for the first time for a BBC one-hour-long special performance, Adele at the BBC, which was recorded on 2 November 2015 and was broadcast on BBC One on 20 November 2015. She also performed the song at the 17th NRJ Music Awards on 7 November 2015, at Radio City Music Hall in New York City on 17 November 2015 as her opening number (Adele Live in New York City), and on Saturday Night Live on 21 November 2015. On 23 November 2015, after appearing on The Tonight Show Starring Jimmy Fallon, Adele recorded the song with Fallon and his house band, The Roots, playing classroom instruments. The version was broadcast on the show the following night.
On 13 December 2015 Adele performed "Hello" on the X Factor live final at The SSE Arena, Wembley.

Cover versions
 American singer Demi Lovato covered "Hello" at the 2015 106.1 KISS FM Fall Ball in Seattle on 14 November 2015. Their rendition was met with critical acclaim. It eventually received a nomination for "Best Cover Song" at the 3rd iHeartRadio Music Awards in 2016.
 In December 2015, Washington, D.C.-based go-go band Backyard Band released a cover version of the song, which has become widely popular in the area since its release.
In December 2015, Claudio Sanchez of American progressive metal band Coheed & Cambria posted an acoustic cover on YouTube. The cover was described by critics as "haunting".
 During New Year's Eve 2015, Canadian singer Celine Dion put her own spin on "Hello" at her residency show in Las Vegas.
On June 24, 2022, Canadian singer-songwriter Avril Lavigne released a cover of the song for her Spotify Singles release.

Credits and personnel
Personnel
 Lead vocals, drums – Adele
 Songwriting – Adele Adkins, Greg Kurstin
 Production, piano, bass, drums, guitar, electronic keyboard – Greg Kurstin
 Mixing – Tom Elmhirst
 Engineering – Alex Pasco, Greg Kurstin, Julian Burg, Liam Nolan
 Mastering – Randy Merrill, Tom Coyne
 Additional instruments – Emile Haynie

Charts

Weekly charts

Year-end charts

Decade-end charts

Certifications and sales

Radio and release history

See also

 List of Billboard Hot 100 number-one singles of 2015
 List of Billboard Hot 100 number-one singles of 2016
 List of Adult Top 40 number-one songs of the 2010s
 List of Billboard Dance/Mix Show Airplay number-one singles of 2015
 List of Hot 100 Airplay number-one singles of the 2010s
 List of Billboard Mainstream Top 40 number-one songs of 2015
 List of Billboard Adult Contemporary number ones of 2015 and 2016 (U.S.)
 List of number-one dance singles of 2015 (U.S.)
 List of number-one singles of 2015 (Australia)
 List of number-one digital tracks of 2015 (Australia)
 List of best-selling singles in Australia
 List of number-one hits of 2015 (Austria)
 List of Ultratop 50 number-one singles of 2015
 List of Ultratop 50 number-one singles of 2015
 List of Ultratop 50 number-one singles of 2016
 List of Ultratop 50 number-one singles of 2016
 List of Canadian Hot 100 number-one singles of 2015
 List of number-one digital songs of 2015 (Canada)
 List of number-one digital songs of 2016 (Canada)
 List of number-one hits of 2015 (Denmark)
 List of number-one singles of 2015 (Finland)
 List of number-one hits of 2015 (France)
 List of number-one hits of 2016 (France)
 List of number-one hits of 2015 (Germany)
 List of number-one hits of 2016 (Germany)
 List of German airplay number-one songs
 List of German airplay number-one songs
 List of number-one singles of the 2010s (Hungary)
 List of number-one singles of 2015 (Ireland)
 List of number-one hits of 2015 (Italy)
 List of number-one songs of 2016 (Mexico)
 List of Mexico Ingles Airplay singles of the 2010s
 List of Dutch Top 40 number-one singles of 2015
 List of number-one singles from the 2010s (New Zealand)
 List of number-one songs in Norway
 List of number-one singles of 2015 (Poland)
 List of Romandie Charts number-one singles of 2015
 List of Romandie Charts number-one singles of 2016
 List of Scottish number-one singles of 2015
 List of number-one singles of 2015 (Slovenia)
 List of number-one singles of 2016 (Slovenia)
 List of number-one singles of 2015 (South Africa)
 List of number-one singles of 2016 (South Africa)
 List of number-one international songs of 2015 (South Korea)
 List of number-one international songs of 2016 (South Korea)
 List of number-one singles of 2015 (Spain)
 List of Most Airplay number-one singles of 2015 (Spain)
 List of Most Airplay number-one singles of 2016 (Spain)
 List of number-one singles of the 2010s (Sweden)
 List of number-one hits of 2015 (Switzerland)
 List of number-one hits of 2016 (Switzerland)
 List of UK Singles Chart number ones of the 2010s
 List of UK Independent Singles Chart number ones of 2015
 List of UK Independent Singles Chart number ones of 2016
 List of most liked YouTube videos
 List of most streamed songs on Spotify
 List of most-viewed YouTube videos
 List of most viewed online videos in the first 24 hours

References

2010s ballads
2015 singles
2015 songs
Adele songs
Billboard Hot 100 number-one singles
Black-and-white music videos
Brit Award for British Single
Canadian Hot 100 number-one singles
Columbia Records singles
Dutch Top 40 number-one singles
Grammy Award for Record of the Year
Grammy Award for Song of the Year
Grammy Award for Best Pop Solo Performance
Irish Singles Chart number-one singles
Juno Award for Video of the Year videos
Number-one singles in Australia
Number-one singles in Austria
Number-one singles in Denmark
Number-one singles in Finland
Number-one singles in Germany
Number-one singles in Greece
Number-one singles in Hungary
Number-one singles in Israel
Number-one singles in Italy
Number-one singles in New Zealand
Number-one singles in Norway
Number-one singles in Poland
Number-one singles in Scotland
Number-one singles in Spain
Number-one singles in Sweden
Number-one singles in Switzerland
Pop ballads
Song recordings produced by Greg Kurstin
Song recordings with Wall of Sound arrangements
Songs about loneliness
Songs about telephone calls
Songs written by Adele
Songs written by Greg Kurstin
Soul ballads
South African Airplay Chart number-one singles
SNEP Top Singles number-one singles
Torch songs
UK Singles Chart number-one singles
UK Independent Singles Chart number-one singles
Ultratop 50 Singles (Flanders) number-one singles
Ultratop 50 Singles (Wallonia) number-one singles
XL Recordings singles